A Different Light may refer to:

A Different Light (album), a 2007 album by the band Sherwood
A Different Light (bookstore), an LGBT bookstore chain that operated from 1979 to 2011
A Different Light, a 1978 science fiction novel by Elizabeth Lynn

See also
Different Light, a 1986 album by The Bangles
In a Different Light (disambiguation)